Valerie Wildman is an American actress and humanitarian.

Early life
Wildman was born in Miami Beach, to Leslie Ames, a Ford model and the first "Revlon" girl.

Wildman holds a master's degree in Counseling.

Film career
Valerie Wildman’s first major film appearance was in Oliver Stone’s critically acclaimed  “Salvador”, in which she played a provocative journalist “Pauline Axelrod”. She has appeared and starred in numerous films and television shows, including 11 years on “Days of Our Lives” in the role of “Fay Walker” and the recurring role of “ Christine Petit” on “Beverly Hills 90210.”

Filmography

Film

Television

Video games

References

External links
 

Year of birth missing (living people)
Living people
20th-century American actresses
21st-century American actresses
American film actresses
American television actresses
People from Miami Beach, Florida